John Fitzedmund was the Dean of Cloyne in Ireland from 1591 to 1612.

References

Alumni of Trinity College Dublin
Irish Anglicans
Deans of Cloyne
1612 deaths